Mohammad Kamran Khan (born 14 December 1969) is a Pakistani former cricketer. He played 57 first-class and 54 List A matches for several domestic teams in Pakistan between 1986 and 1998.

See also
 List of Pakistan Automobiles Corporation cricketers

References

External links
 

1969 births
Living people
Pakistani cricketers
Allied Bank Limited cricketers
Islamabad cricketers
Lahore cricketers
Pakistan Automobiles Corporation cricketers
Pakistan International Airlines cricketers
Pakistan University Grants Commission cricketers
Cricketers from Lahore
Burki family